Patricia Cornelius is an Australian playwright and co-founder of Melbourne Workers Theatre.

Plays

Cornelius has written more than 20 plays, which include Slut (2008, Platform Youth Theatre), The Call (2009, Griffin Theatre Company), Good, Do Not Go Gentle… (2010, fortyfivedownstairs), Boy Overboard (2004, Australian Theatre for Young People), Love (2005, Malthouse Theatre), Lilly and May and Hog's Hairs and Leeches.

Awards

Cornelius has won numerous awards, including AWGIEs, Green Room Awards and in 2006, the Patrick White Playwrights' Award. Her 2005 play, Love, won the Wal Cherry Prize for New Plays. Her 2010 play Do Not Go Gentle... received the NSW Premier's Literary Award for Drama in 2011 and won the 2011 Victorian Premier's Louis Esson Prize for Drama. Cornelius won the 2019 Windham–Campbell Literature Prize in Drama. She also received a lifetime achievement award at the 2019 Green Room Awards.

Other works

Her first novel My Sister Jill, was published in 2003 by St. Martin's Press.

Cornelius also co-wrote the screenplay of the 2009 film Blessed, based on Who's Afraid of the Working Class, with co-writers Andrew Bovell, Melissa Reeves and Christos Tsiolkas.

References

Australian dramatists and playwrights
Living people
Year of birth missing (living people)